The first season of The Voice of China is a Chinese reality talent show that premiered on 13 July 2012, on the Zhejiang Television sponsored by Jiaduobao.

Teams

Colour key

Blind auditions
 Colour key

Episode 1 (13 July)

Episode 2 (20 July)

Episode 3 (27 July)

 - Yang Kun pressed Na Ying's button.

Episode 4 (3 August)

Episode 5 (10 August)

Episode 6 (17 August)

The Battles
Coaches begin narrowing down the playing field by training the artists with the help of "Dream Coaches" ("Trusted Advisors" in English-speaking countries). They are San Bao for Team Liu Huan, Wang Chi-ping for Team Harlem, Wang Feng for Team Na Ying, and Coco Lee for Team Yang Kun. Each episode features battles consisting of pairings from within each team, and each battle concludes with the respective coach eliminating one of the two artists. After the Battles, one artist is chosen by each coach to automatically advance to the Playoffs.

Colour key

The Knockouts
The Knockouts, which were taped together with the Battles, were featured on the second half of the episodes aired on 24, 31 August and 7, 14 September 2012. The winning artists are paired through the drawing of lots and must sing once more to earn one of the remaining three team spots.

Colour key

The Playoffs
There are three rounds in The Playoffs. In the first round, the four contestants have their own performances, and the coach decides on the contestant to advance to the final round. The 99-person media will eliminate one artist based on their votes, and they can choose to either vote or not vote for an artist. In the second round, the two remaining artists compete against each other, and the votes are decided by the media as well as the coach, who gives a total of 100 points for both artists. The artist with the highest number of votes advances to the next round. In the final round, the two remaining artists compete against each other, and the voting system is the same with the second round. The artist with the highest number of votes is the team champion and will advance to the finals.

 Colour key

Round 1

Round 2

Round 3

Final Concert - Winner Announced (Episode 14)

The season finale aired on Sunday, September 30, 2012 which took place at Shanghai Stadium in Shanghai, China. Bruce Liang 梁博 was named the winner.

On finale night, Adam performed a duet with "Voice" contestant Zhang Wei 张玮 off his hit song, Whataya Want From Me which exploded with praise on Sina Weibo, China's Twitter-like service.

References 

Season 1
2012 Chinese television seasons